Phoebe Victoria Licence (born 20 August 1999) is a women's footballer who plays as a midfielder for the Bahrain women's national football team and the American college soccer team Flagler Saints. She also played for Exeter City in England.

Personal life
Licence was born in Manama, Bahrain to English parents Simon and Jane Licence. She has a two older brothers, Seb and her twin brother William Licence. To whom she credits her inspiration and passion for football. She graduated from King's College, Taunton.

Club career 
Licence has played for Exeter City women's football club in the FA Women's National League South West Division One.

International career
Licence made her senior debut for Bahrain on 22 May 2013 in the 2014 AFC Women's Asian Cup qualification match against Vietnam. She participated in the 2019 WAFF Women's Championship held at Bahrain where she scored a goal in the group stage win against Lebanon.

International goals

References

External links 

1999 births
Living people
Sportspeople from Manama
Bahraini women's footballers
Bahrain women's international footballers
English expatriates in Bahrain
English women's footballers
English expatriate women's footballers
FA Women's National League players
English expatriate sportspeople in the United States
Expatriate women's soccer players in the United States
People educated at King's College, Taunton
Women's association football midfielders